Montcavrel is a commune in the Pas-de-Calais department in the Hauts-de-France region of France.

Geography
Montcavrel is situated in the valley of the small river Bimoise, 4 miles (6 km) north of Montreuil-sur-Mer, on the D149 and D150 road junction.

Population

Places of interest
 The fifteenth-century church of St.Quentin.
  The château d'Hérambault 1845, in Renaissance style
 The nineteenth-century château de Montéchor.
 A watermill at Fordres.

See also
Communes of the Pas-de-Calais department

References

Communes of Pas-de-Calais